Luge at the 1994 Winter Olympics consisted of three events at Lillehammer Olympic Bobsleigh and Luge Track.  The competition took place between 13 and 18 February 1994.

Medal summary

Medal table

Italy led the medal table, with its four medals the most won by that country in luge, as of 2010.

Events

Participating NOCs
Twenty-five nations participated in Luge at the Lillehammer Games. Bosnia and Herzegovina, Estonia, Georgia, Greece, Russia, Slovakia and Ukraine made their Olympic luge debuts.

References

 
1994
1994 Winter Olympics events
1994 in luge